Phenaridine (2,5-dimethylfentanyl) is an opioid analgesic that is an analogue of fentanyl. It was developed in  1972, and is used for surgical anasthesia. 
 
Phenaridine has similar effects to fentanyl. It is slightly less potent than fentanyl in rats. Side effects of fentanyl analogs are similar to those of fentanyl itself, which include itching, nausea and potentially serious respiratory depression, which can be life-threatening. Irresponsible use of fentanyl analogues administrated in several times larger doses than recommended, have ended up in a death of hundreds of people throughout Europe and the former Soviet republics since the most recent resurgence in use began in Estonia in the early 2000s, and novel derivatives continue to appear.

See also 
 3-Methylfentanyl
 4-Fluorofentanyl
 α-Methylfentanyl
 Acetylfentanyl
 Furanylfentanyl
 List of fentanyl analogues

References 

Synthetic opioids
Piperidines
Propionamides
Anilides
Mu-opioid receptor agonists